Rodin Jair Quiñones Rentería (born 30 May 1995) is a Colombian professional footballer who plays as wing-back for Patriotas Boyacá.

Honours

Club 
Atlético Nacional
 Categoría Primera A (4): 2013 Apertura, 2013 Finalización, 2014 Apertura, 2015 Finalización
 Copa Colombia (1): 2013
 Superliga Colombiana (1): 2016

External links 
 

1995 births
Living people
Colombian footballers
Colombian expatriate footballers
Colombia under-20 international footballers
Categoría Primera A players
Atlético Nacional footballers
Independiente Medellín footballers
Deportes Temuco footballers
Primera B de Chile players
Expatriate footballers in Chile
Colombian expatriate sportspeople in Chile
People from Tumaco
Association football defenders
Sportspeople from Nariño Department